Sitzmark Ski Area is a small ski area near the community of Havillah, Okanogan County, Washington,  northeast of the city of Tonasket. The area's 10 named trails, covering 80 skiable acres, are located on Knob Hill. Its slopes are served by one double chairlift and one rope tow.

The area's "signature run" is Stump Run.

References

External links
 
 Photos and description of Sitzmark's chairlift at Liftblog
 Sitzmark at SkiMap.org

Ski areas and resorts in Washington (state)
Buildings and structures in Okanogan County, Washington
Tourist attractions in Okanogan County, Washington